The Lotus Effect is the third studio album by the Dutch progressive metal band Sun Caged, released on June 17, 2011 by Lion Music. The album features the same lineup as their previous album Artemisia except for the loss of bassist Roel Vink, who was replaced by Daniel Kohn. Writing and arranging music for the album began almost immediately after release of Artemisia in 2007, with instrumental recording beginning in late 2008. Like their previous work, this album contains many complex musical compositions, with tracks 8-14 on disc forming the 25-minute medley titled "Ashtamangala (The 8 Auspicious Symbols)"

Track listing

Personnel

Band members 
 Paul Adrian Villarreal − vocals
 Marcel Coenen − lead guitar
 Rene Kroon − keyboards
 Daniel Kohn − bass
 Roel van Helden − drums and percussion

Production 
 Intro by Daniel Kohn. 
 Mixed by René Kroon and Marcel Coenen.
 Mastered by René Kroon 
 All music written and arranged by Sun Caged
 All lyrics by Paul Adrian Villarreal.
 Produced by Sun Caged.

References

Sun Caged albums
2011 albums